The Union Church of Vinalhaven is a historic church on East Main Street in the center of Vinalhaven, Maine.  Built in 1899, it is a high quality example of Shingle style architecture, designed by one of its major promoters, John Calvin Stevens.  It was listed on the National Register of Historic Places in 1984.

Description and history
The Union Church stands on the south side of East Main Street in downtown Vinalhaven, just east of its junction with Atlantic Avenue.  The church is a single-story wood-frame structure, with a gabled roof and shingled exterior.  The long side of the building faces the street, with a square tower projecting at the right end.  The tower rises to a louvered belfry and a pyramidal roof, whose corners have projecting hip sections over the piers that flank the belfry louvers.  The main entrance is at the base of the tower, sheltered by a gabled porch.  A wide wall dormer is set in the center of that facade, with a tripartite Gothic window.  The west-facing gable end is also adorned with a large Gothic window, with small oriel windows on either side.

The church was built by Otto Nelson according to a design by Stevens, who was Maine's best-known architect of the turn of the 20th century.  Stevens was a major promoter of the Shingle style, and this church is an excellent example of the style.  It was built to replace an earlier structure, built in 1860 when Vinalhaven was a major center for granite quarrying and shipping.

See also
National Register of Historic Places listings in Knox County, Maine

References

External links
 

19th-century churches in the United States
Churches completed in 1899
Churches in Knox County, Maine
Churches on the National Register of Historic Places in Maine
National Register of Historic Places in Knox County, Maine
Shingle Style church buildings
Vinalhaven, Maine
1899 establishments in Maine
Shingle Style architecture in Maine